The Our Lady of Grace Cathedral  also called Setúbal Cathedral is the name given to a religious building affiliated with the Catholic Church that works as the Cathedral of Setúbal, a city in Portugal. It is located in the heart of the primitive medieval town of Setúbal, around which the most important medieval district of the city as well as the religious and administrative center developed.

Founded in the thirteenth century, the current building is a reconstruction of the High Renaissance with a Mannerist facade. Inside are frescoed columns and tiles of the seventeenth and eighteenth centuries.

On a side street is the Gothic porch of an old house, the Hospital João Palmeiro.

See also
Roman Catholicism in Portugal
Our Lady of Grace Cathedral

References

Setubal
Buildings and structures in Setúbal